Rasa Duende is a 3 piece band who mix together Hindustani and Flamenco music played on a tabala, a sarod and a flamenco guitar. Their album Improvisations was nominated for 2013 ARIA Award for Best World Music Album.

Members
Bobby Singh - tabla
Adrian McNeil - sarod
Damian Wright - flamenco guitar

Discography

Albums

Awards and nominations

ARIA Music Awards
The ARIA Music Awards is an annual awards ceremony that recognises excellence, innovation, and achievement across all genres of Australian music. They commenced in 1987.

! 
|-
| 2013
| Improvisations 
| ARIA Award for Best World Music Album
| 
| 
|-

References

External links
 Rasa Duende Bio at adrianmcneil.com

Australian world music groups